The Dryanovo is a river in Bulgaria, in Gabrovo Province and Veliko Tarnovo Province, a tributary of the Belitsa from the basin of the Yantra, flowing into the Danube).

It issues from the mountains close to the town of Tryavna and flows into the Belitsa at the town of Debelets (a kilometer south to the city of Veliko Tarnovo).

The river Dryanovo passes through Plachkovtsi, Tryavna, Tsareva Livada, Dryanovo, Ganchovets, Sokolovo and Debelets.

Landforms of Veliko Tarnovo Province
Landforms of Gabrovo Province
Rivers of Bulgaria